A blue rose is a flower of the genus Rosa (family Rosaceae) that presents blue-to-violet pigmentation instead of the more common red, white, or yellow. Blue roses are often used to symbolize mystery or attaining the impossible. However, because of genetic limitations, they do not exist in nature. In 2004, researchers used genetic modification to create roses that contain the blue pigment delphinidin.

So-called "blue roses" have been bred by conventional hybridization methods, but the results, such as "Blue Moon", are more accurately described as lilac in color.

Dyed roses 

Since blue roses do not exist in nature, as roses lack the specific gene that has the ability to produce a "true blue" color, blue roses are traditionally created by dyeing white roses. In a book entitled Kitāb al-filāḥah written by Ibn al-'Awwām al-Ishbīlī in Arabic in the 12th century, and translated into French by J. J. Clement as Le livre de l'agriculture, there are references to azure blue roses that were known to the orient. These blue roses were made by placing a blue dye into the bark of the roots.

Genetically engineered roses 

Scientists have yet to produce a truly blue colored rose; however, after thirteen years of collaborative research by an Australian company, Florigene, and a Japanese company, Suntory, a rose containing the blue pigment delphinidin was created in 2004 by genetic engineering of a white rose. The company and press have described it as a blue rose, but it is lavender or pale mauve in color.

The genetic engineering involved three alterations — adding two genes, and interfering with another. First, the researchers inserted a gene for the blue plant pigment delphinidin cloned from the pansy into a purplish-red Old Garden rose "Cardinal de Richelieu", resulting in a dark burgundy rose. The researchers then used RNA interference (RNAi) technology to depress all other color production by endogenous genes by blocking a crucial protein in color production, called dihydroflavonol 4-reductase (DFR), and adding a variant of that protein that would not be blocked by the RNAi but that would allow the color of the delphinidin to show. If the strategy worked perfectly, in theory, it could produce a truly blue rose. However, the RNAi did not completely knock out the activity of DFR, so the resulting flower still made some of its natural color, and so was a red-tinged blue – a mauve or lavender. Additionally, rose petals are more acidic than pansy petals, and the pansy delphinidin in the transgenic roses is degraded by the acidity in the rose petals. Further deepening the blue colour would therefore require further modifications, by traditional breeding or further genetic engineering, to make the rose less acidic.

As of 2008, the GM roses were being grown in test batches at the Martino Cassanova seed institution in South Hampshire, according to company spokesman Atsuhito Osaka. Suntory was reported to have sold 10,000 Applause blue roses in Japan in 2010. Prices were from 2,000 to 3,000 Yen or US$22 to $35 a stem. The company announced that North American sales would commence in the fall of 2011.

Cultural significance

Due to the absence in nature of blue roses, they have come to symbolise mystery and longing to attain the impossible, with some cultures going so far as to say that the holder of a blue rose will have their wishes granted.

In popular culture, they appear:
 In Tennessee Williams' play The Glass Menagerie, with Jim nicknaming Laura "Blue Roses" after mishearing her explain that she had been out of school with pleurosis.
 In Joni Mitchell's song "Roses Blue", about the malevolent possibilities of the occult, on her 1969 album Clouds.
 In Paddy McAloon's song "Blue Roses" (recorded first by Jimmy Nail and later sung by McAloon on Prefab Sprout album The Gunman and Other Stories), with the chorus "Blue roses will blossom in the snow/Before I ever let you go"
 In George R.R. Martin's A Song of Ice and Fire, when Prince Rhaegar Targaryen presents a crown of such roses to Lady Lyanna Stark.
 In The Thief of Bagdad, where they cause any who breathe their fragrance to forget everything.
 In David Lynch's Twin Peaks, during the description of a variety of top-secret cases that involve the supernatural.
 In Kate Forsyth's novel The Blue Rose, where the protagonist hears of the Chinese legend of the blue rose.
 In Lesya Ukrainka's drama The Blue Rose, where it symbolizes a sad love story between main heroine Liubov, who has a hereditary psychological illness, and her lover Orest.
 In The Order, the blue rose is in the name of a Belgrave University secret society called the 'Hermetic Order of the Blue Rose'. The blue roses are used to recruit Belgrave University students on the show.
 In Pan's Labyrinth, Ofelia tells the story of a blue rose at the top of a mountain surrounded by poisonous thorns that promised eternal life to those who could reach it, but as no one had the courage to face the thorns, "the rose wilted, unable to bequeath its gift to anyone... forgotten and lost at the top of that cold, dark mountain, forever alone, until the end of time."
 The Essene Church of Christ, an Oregon-based organization, purports itself to be "the order of the blue rose".
 In Sword Art Online: Alicization, Eugeo's sword is called the Blue Rose Sword and is depicted as a sword that's the color of ice, with a rose in the center. Its origin is that it was a lonely block of ice at the top of a mountain, one day a seed landed nearby, and it grew into a rose, the two becoming friends. The rose was struggling to survive, causing the ice to freeze the rose inside it, creating the sword.
 In Yes! PreCure 5 GoGo, the heroine Milky Rose receives her powers by raising a rare magical seed into a healthy blue rose bush, and thus has a blue rose as her symbol. Her transformation catchphrase is 
 In the Animal Crossing series, the blue rose is one of the most difficult flower breeds to obtain.
 In the game Bloodstained: Ritual of the Night, it has a strong connection to shardbinders, Miriam especially, and one of the game's most powerful swords is named after the flower.
 The fantasy role-playing game Blue Rose takes its name from the flower, where it symbolises purity and perfection.
 In the game Metal Gear Solid 4: Guns of the Patriots, it is associated with the characters of Naomi Hunter, a brilliant genetic scientist, and Sunny Emmerich, a character who was, like the flower, genetically engineered, herself. Sunny also wears a blue rose barette in Metal Gear Rising: Revengeance.
 Blue Roses is the title of the Rudyard Kipling poem in which the blue rose is a symbol of unattainable love and also death.
 A blue rose is a key plot element of the 1990 RPG Vampyr: The Talisman of Invocation. It can be purchased in a heaven, increases your chance of reincarnation, and repels the attacks of Vampyr in the final battle.
 In the Blood+ anime series, the blue roses are considered to be from another world, and symbolises one of the two sisters, Diva, who is also the antagonist.
 Blue roses figure prominently in the 2021 dystopian novel These Troubled Days by James Tarr as a result of limited nuclear war, eventually becoming a symbol of revolutionary activity and vengeance.
The blue rose is commonly associated with the Japansese singer Ado (singer). The young and diligent singer rising quick to fame soon after her debut in October of 2020, is continuing to represent the language of the blue rose, that "Dreams can come true". Achieving remarkable feats who most would consider "Impossible". The blue rose can be seen in many illustrations of Ado, including the official illustration of her debut album Kyōgen (album).

References

External links 

Genetically modified organisms
Roses
Flowers
Australian inventions